Moti Sasson (born 1947 in Holon) is the current, and 5th mayor of Holon, Israel. He is a graduate of the History of the Middle East, Arabic language and literature department of Tel Aviv University. He was deputy and acting mayor between 1984–1989. He has worked hard to generate an image of the city as a 'Kids city', establishing the Holon Children's Museum, and large gardens and play parks around the city. Under his leadership Holon has been awarded 5 gold stars by the Council for a beautiful Israel.

References

http://www.jpost.com/Home/Article.aspx?id=185323
http://www.jpost.com/Israel/Article.aspx?id=183567
Election tracker for 2008 municipal elections (Hebrew)
News article on Moti Sasson (Hebrew)

1947 births
Living people
Deputy mayors of places in Israel
Hebrew University of Jerusalem alumni
Israeli Labor Party politicians
Mayors of places in Israel
People from Holon
Tel Aviv University alumni
Israeli people of Syrian-Jewish descent